Fandi bin Ahmad  (born 29 May 1962) is a Singaporean professional football manager and former player. During his professional career, he mainly played as a striker, but also played as a midfielder. Along with the Singapore FA, he had also played for Malaysia Cup state sides Kuala Lumpur FA and Pahang FA, and won titles with all three, including two doubles in 1992 and 1994, as well as the Golden Boot in 1988. Fandi also played for Indonesia's Niac Mitra, Netherlands' Groningen as well as local Singaporean clubs Geylang United and SAFFC.

Internationally with the Singapore national team, Fandi earned 101 caps and scored 55 goals, a record he holds today, as well as winning three Southeast Asian Games (SEA Games) silver medals while being captain from 1993 to 1997. After his retirement, he began his managerial career in 2000 by helming his former playing club SAFFC, before moving on to Indonesia's Pelita Raya and Malaysia's Johor Darul Takzim, while also serving as the assistant national coach on numerous occasions while and running his own Fandi Ahmad Academy.

Fandi has been described as a national legend for Singapore. In 1994, he was awarded the Pingat Bakti Masyarakat (Public Service Medal) for his achievements, which included being the first Singaporean footballer to play in Europe, the first Singaporean millionaire sportsperson and the first Singaporean sportsperson to have a published biography. He has five children with his wife, South African model Wendy Jacobs, and his father is Ahmad Wartam, a former national goalkeeper. Fandi was ranked sixth in a list of Singapore's 50 Greatest Athletes of the Century by The Straits Times in 1999. His children, most notably Ikhsan, Ilhan and Irfan, are also professional footballers.

He is currently the technical adviser of Malaysia Super League club Sri Pahang.

Early life
As a young child, Fandi was obsessed with football and spent much of his time kicking a ball. His family lived in a two-room public housing flat in Hougang. His family was working class; Fandi had to sell nasi lemak to help support the family. Fandi's father, Ahmad Wartam was then a goalkeeper for the national team. Fandi started playing as a goalkeeper, but was advised by a teacher to switch to midfield.

When he was 12, his parents divorced, after which he lived with his father and paternal grandparents. At Serangoon Gardens Secondary School, Fandi played for the school football team, but neglected his studies and was held back a year. He then transferred to the Singapore Vocational Institute and obtained a National Trade Certificate 3. He played for Kaki Bukit Football Club in the amateur National Football League, where he was spotted by Singapore FA coach Sebastian Yap.

Club career

Fandi joined Singapore FA in 1979 and became a regular midfield player, scoring four goals in his first Malaysia Cup season. The retirement of Arshad Khamis and Dollah Kassim prompted Jita Singh, the new Singapore FA coach, to play Fandi as a striker. During the 1980 Malaysia Cup season, Fandi scored eight goals, including the winning goal in the final against Selangor FA. He enlisted for National Service in September 1980 and was given light duties, such as collecting the camp garbage, so he could continue playing for Singapore FA. In 1981, Fandi won the FAS Footballer of the Year award for helping Singapore FA reach the Malaysia Cup final. The following year, Singapore FA did not play in the Malaysia Cup for political reasons, and Fandi underwent a shoulder operation; he could not play football for six weeks and was discharged early from National Service.

Selangor FA invited Fandi to play for them against Argentine club Boca Juniors, which featured Diego Maradona, in a friendly game, in which Fandi scored the only goal for Selangor FA; the score was 2–1. Fandi received offers from several Malaysia Cup teams, Indonesian side Niac Mitra, Swiss club Young Boys and Dutch side Ajax. After a three-week trial, Ajax offered Fandi a three-year contract, but Fandi instead signed a one-year contract with Niac Mitra, where he spent one season, helped them successfully defend their Galatama League title and was the third-highest scorer with 13 goals. In a friendly match between Niac Mitra and Arsenal, Fandi scored a goal in a 2–0 victory; however, he left Niac Mitra due to a sudden Galatama League ban on foreign players.

In 1983, Fandi moved to the Netherlands and signed a two-year contract with FC Groningen. A thigh injury acquired in a friendly match kept him off the field for ten weeks, but in his first Eredivisie game he scored twice in a 2–0 victory over Go Ahead Eagles. Three days later, he played in the first leg of a UEFA Cup second-round match against Italian side Internazionale, and scored the second goal in a 2–0 win, though in the second leg Groningen were defeated 1–5. The Groningen fans voted Fandi the most popular player and the most skilful player that season; he scored 10 goals in 29 games to help the Dutch club rise from ninth to fifth place in the Eredivisie. As an April Fools' Day joke, The Straits Times published a front-page story claiming that Manchester United had signed on Fandi. His second season was marred by a recurrence of his thigh injury and a dispute with his coach. He played only two full games that season and Groningen did not offer him a new contract. During his time in the Netherlands, Fandi scored 11 league goals in 36 league games for Groningen.

The next club that Fandi played for was Malaysia Cup side Kuala Lumpur FA, which in 1987 won its first Malaysia Cup title. It was Malaysia Cup champions again the following season; Fandi won the Golden Boot, having scored 21 goals. After a third season at Kuala Lumpur FA, in which it won a third consecutive Malaysia Cup, Fandi signed a two-year contract with Greek club OFI Crete in 1990. However, problems with his International Transfer Certificate prevented him from playing for Crete, so he left Greece after two months. Fandi then joined Pahang FA, where he reverted to playing mainly in midfield due to his advancing age. Fandi missed several months of games because of heel and thigh injuries, and scored three goals to help Pahang FA win the Malaysia Cup and Malaysian League Double in 1992. That year, he became the first Singaporean sportsperson to have career earnings exceeding a million Singapore dollars (not adjusted for inflation).

Fandi rejoined Singapore FA after it was relegated to the second tier of the Malaysian League. Singapore FA was promoted and reached the Malaysia Cup final in 1993, and finished the 1994 season as Malaysia Cup and Malaysian League champions. Captain Fandi played in 39 of Singapore FA's 41 games in the double-winning season, was the top scorer with 26 goals and was voted Player of the Season; he was also awarded a state medal, the Pingat Bakti Masyarakat (Public Service Medal). The following season, Singapore FA withdrew from the Malaysia Cup and a fully professional Singaporean league, the S.League, was formed. In its inaugural season in 1996, Fandi captained Geylang United and was the joint top scorer with 11 goals, including the equaliser that confirmed Geylang as league champions. The Asian Football Confederation declared him the Player of the Month of June 1996. Geylang was given special dispensation to pay Fandi thrice the S.League salary cap. His playing career concluded with three seasons at SAFFC, during which they won two S.League titles and two Singapore Cups. Because of injuries, Fandi was limited to mainly short substitute appearances, but he continued to score crucial goals, notably two against Cambodian side Royal Dolphins in the Asian Club Championship, until his retirement in 1999.

International career
From  1979 to 1997, Fandi made 101 appearances for the Singapore national football team, scored 55 goals and earned a place in the Asian Football Confederation Hall of Fame. He started as captain of the national youth team that won the Lion City Cup in 1976 and 1977, then joined the senior national team on a tour of Russia, where he played in two friendly games and scored two goals in the second. His first senior cap came at 17 years, 3 months and 23 days, making him Singapore's youngest-ever full international, until his record was broken by Hariss Harun in 2007. However, in his first international competition, the 1979 SEA Games, Fandi did not score in four matches. He scored against India and North Korea in the Olympic Games qualifiers, but did not score in three FIFA World Cup qualifying matches. In the 1981 Ovaltine Cup, Fandi scored all Singapore goals in the 3–2 aggregate victory over Malaysia. Fandi scored a goal in a 1–2 loss to Thailand in the 1981 King's Cup and a hat-trick against the Philippines at the 1981 SEA Games. In 1992, Fandi scored twice against Nepal and once against Thailand in the King's Cup, then scored when Singapore beat Malaysia 3–1 in the Ovaltine Cup.

The following year, Fandi helped Singapore win the first of three SEA Games silver medals, with two goals in a 3–0 group stage win over Brunei and two against Malaysia in the semi-final. Despite suffering an ankle injury in the 1–2 final defeat by Thailand, he played in the 1983 Merlion Cup, and scored in a 1–0 semi-final win against of China. The second SEA Games silver medal came in 1985, when Fandi scored against Malaysia and the Philippines in the group stage, then two goals against Brunei in the semi-final. At the 1989 SEA Games, Fandi scored in the 4–0 victory over Myanmar that took Singapore past the group stages, the last-minute winner in the semi-final against defending champions Indonesia and Singapore's single goal in the 1–3 final defeat by Malaysia. This completed the hat-trick of silver medals, though in 2007, he said that "not winning the SEA Games gold medal" was among "his biggest regrets". Fandi also played at the 1990 Asian Games and scored in the 6–1 win against Pakistan.

During the 1991 SEA Games, Fandi scored both Singapore goals against Myanmar in the group stage, but was substituted in the semi-final match, after Indonesian fullback Herry Setyawan elbowed him in the eye. That match ended goalless and the Lions lost on penalties. Fandi also missed Singapore's failed attempt to qualify for the 1992 Asian Cup, having sustained a heel injury. At the 1993 SEA Games, captain Fandi scored a hat-trick in the 7–0 defeat of the Philippines, followed by the second Singapore goal in the 3–3 semi-final draw with Myanmar and scored once in the 3–1 win over Indonesia that secured a bronze medal for Singapore. Fandi also played in the inaugural Tiger Cup, and scored an equaliser against Malaysia, a goal against Brunei and two against the Philippines. 1997 was a disappointing year for Fandi, who failed to score in the Dunhill Cup and the World Cup qualifiers. After the 1997 SEA Games, where his goal in the semi-final could not prevent a 1–2 defeat to Indonesia, Fandi retired from international football.

Coaching career

After his retirement from playing, Fandi worked as a coach. He started as the assistant to Singapore's national coach, Vincent Subramaniam, for the 1999 SEA Games, where Singapore finished fourth. In 2000, Fandi became coach of SAFFC and guided them to the S.League title, and he won the S.League Coach of the Year Award. Under Fandi, SAFFC ended the 2001 season without winning a trophy and were 2002 S.League champions by a 20-point margin. Fandi then simultaneously served as assistant national coach, helping Singapore win the Tiger Cup in 2005, and coach of the Young Lions, which rose from the bottom of the S.League in 2003 to two third-place finishes in 2004 and 2006.

From November 2006 to March 2010, Fandi managed Indonesian side Pelita Raya, where he adopted a youth policy that helped them win promotion from the second division, then guided the club to two mid-table finishes in the Indonesia Super League. Since then, he has been a scout for Italian club Vicenza Calcio, a regional project manager for the Genova International Soccer School and manager of Malaysian Super League side Johor Darul Takzim. In 2011, he founded the Fandi Ahmad Academy, which organises training programmes and overseas opportunities for talented young Singaporean footballers. Fandi is one of seven Singaporean coaches with a professional AFC coaching diploma and is widely considered a future coach of the Singapore national football team; in December 2013, he became head coach of the Singapore LionsXII, with Nazri Nasir as his assistant. In May 2015, he led LionsXII to clinch the Malaysia FA Cup, their first trophy of the season.

Fandi was appointed as the head coach of Young Lions for the 2018 S.League season, replacing Richard Tardy. In May 2018, he was appointed as the interim head coach of the Singapore national football team until the end of the 2018 AFF Suzuki Cup.

Fandi's contract with FAS was extended in November 2019, with the new role as head of elite youth. He aims, together with technical director Joseph Palatsides, to enhance the pathways and structure for the development of youth players for the national teams. After leading the Singapore under-22 at the 2019 SEA Games, Fandi's Young Lions and the under-22s will be taken over by Nazri Nasir in 2020. Fandi will also be part of national team's coach Tatsuma Yoshida's backroom staff.

Beyond football
Fandi is a devout Muslim, avoids scandals, does not smoke or drink, and is often described as humble, filial and compassionate. He married South African model Wendy Jacobs in 1996 and the couple have five children, namingly sons Irfan, Ikhsan, Ilhan, Iryan and a daughter Iman; the four sons are footballers (Irfan, Ikhsan, Ilhan and Iryan). Irfan and Ikhsan who impressed at trials at Arsenal, Chelsea and Milan plays for Thai League 1 club BG Pathum United, Ilhan Fandi plays for Singapore Premier League club Albirex Niigata while Iryan plays for Hougang United under-17. The eldest three (Irfan, Ikhsan and Ilhan) plays for the Singapore national team. On 26 March against Malaysia, the three brothers played together in the same match for the first time.

As for Fandi's daughter Iman, she has decided to pursue a career in singing instead. She has signed with music label Universal Music Singapore in February 2021. Iman names Rihanna and Beyonce among her musical influences. She had initially kept her music a secret from her parents. They were pleasantly surprised when they found out and have expressed their full support for her.

He is the first Singaporean sportsperson to be the subject of a biography, which was released in 1993 and called The Fandi Ahmad Story. It sold 17,000 copies in two months and was also translated into Malay.

Products Fandi has endorsed include Lotto sportswear, Royal Sporting House sportswear, Uncle Tobys cereal, Carnation milk and energy drink Isomax. In 1996, he released an album of English and Malay songs and produced Meniti Pelangi, a television programme about disadvantaged Malay Singaporeans. Three years later, he opened a restaurant and a car dealership, but both closed down within two years. He has also served as an ambassador for national anti-smoking and anti-drug campaigns, raised funds for victims of the 2004 Indonesian tsunami and participated in a Northeast Community Development Council initiative to organise community service programmes.

Career statistics

Honours

Player
Niac Mitra
 Galatama: 1982–83

Kuala Lumpur
 M-League: 1988
 Malaysia Cup: 1987, 1988, 1989 

Pahang
 M-League: 1992
 Malaysia Cup: 1992

Singapore FA
 M-League: 1994
 Malaysia Cup: 1980, 1994

Geylang United
 S.League: 1996

Singapore Armed Forces
 S.League: 1997, 1998
 Singapore FA Cup: 1997
 Singapore Cup: 1999
 League Cup: 1997 

Singapore
 Southeast Asian Games:
Silver medal – 1983, 1985, 1989
Bronze medal – 1991, 1993, 1995

Head coach
Singapore Armed Forces
 S.League: 2000, 2002

LionsXII
 Malaysia FA Cup: 2015

Individual
 S.League Coach of the Year: 2000

Notes

See also
 List of men's footballers with 100 or more international caps

References

Bibliography
 Yeo, Wilfred (1993) "The Fandi Ahmad Story", Brit Aspen Publishing, 

1962 births
Living people
Association football forwards
Association football midfielders
Singaporean footballers
Singapore international footballers
Expatriate footballers in Malaysia
Expatriate footballers in Indonesia
Expatriate footballers in Greece
FC Groningen players
OFI Crete F.C. players
Kuala Lumpur City F.C. players
Sri Pahang FC players
Singapore FA players
Singapore Premier League players
Eredivisie players
Expatriate footballers in the Netherlands
Geylang International FC players
Singaporean people of Malay descent
Singaporean Muslims
Young Lions FC head coaches
LionsXII head coaches
Recipients of the Pingat Bakti Masyarakat
Singapore Premier League head coaches
Warriors FC head coaches
Mitra Kukar players
Footballers at the 1990 Asian Games
Southeast Asian Games silver medalists for Singapore
Southeast Asian Games bronze medalists for Singapore
Southeast Asian Games medalists in football
FIFA Century Club
Competitors at the 1983 Southeast Asian Games
Competitors at the 1985 Southeast Asian Games
Competitors at the 1989 Southeast Asian Games
Competitors at the 1991 Southeast Asian Games
Competitors at the 1993 Southeast Asian Games
Competitors at the 1995 Southeast Asian Games
Asian Games competitors for Singapore
Singaporean expatriate footballers
Singaporean football managers